Bradford Township is a township in McKean County, Pennsylvania, United States.

Geography
The city of Bradford abuts the township to the north. The township contains the unincorporated communities of Custer City, Degolia, Howard, and South Bradford.

Demographics

As of the census of 2010, there were 4,805 people, 1,745 households, and 1,251 families residing in the township.  The population density was 86.7 people per square mile (33.5/km2).  There were 1,826 housing units at an average density of 33.3/sq mi (12.9/km2).  The racial makeup of the township was 98.03% White, 0.58% African American, 0.52% Native American, 0.39% Asian, 0.17% from other races, and 0.31% from two or more races. Hispanic or Latino of any race were 0.62% of the population.

There were 1,745 households, out of which 27.6% had children under the age of 18 living with them, 60.9% were married couples living together, 7.4% had a female householder with no husband present, and 28.3% were non-families. 24.0% of all households were made up of individuals, and 12.7% had someone living alone who was 65 years of age or older.  The average household size was 2.43 and the average family size was 2.88.

In the township the population was spread out, with 20.1% under the age of 18, 12.5% from 18 to 24, 23.0% from 25 to 44, 25.2% from 45 to 64, and 19.2% who were 65 years of age or older.  The median age was 41 years. For every 100 females there were 90.4 males.  For every 100 females age 18 and over, there were 87.6 males.

The median income for a household in the township was $44,302, and the median income for a family was $51,424. Males had a median income of $36,114 versus $24,386 for females. The per capita income for the township was $20,397.  About 3.1% of families and 6.4% of the population were below the poverty line, including 8.6% of those under age 18 and 3.8% of those age 65 or over.

References

Populated places established in 1793
Townships in McKean County, Pennsylvania